Events in the year 2018 in Denmark.

Incumbents
 Monarch – Margrethe II
 Prime Minister – Lars Løkke Rasmussen

Events

May
 May 31 – It was announced that Denmark would be banning full-face veils.

The Arts

Film
 19 November – Lars Mikkelsen wins an International Emmy Award for Best Actor at the 46th International Emmy Awards for his role in Herrens veje.

Sport

Badminton
 16-21 January – Viktor Axelsen wins gold in Men's Single and Kamilla Rytter Juhl and Christinna Pedersen win gold in Women's Double at 2018 Malaysia Masters.
 30 January-4 February – Mathias Christiansen and Christinna Pedersen win Men's Double at 2018 India Open.
 14-18 March – Kamilla Rytter Juhl and Christinna Pedersen wins gold in Women's Doubles at 2018 All England Open.
 24–29 April – With two gold medals, two, silver medals and four bronze medals, Denmark finishes as the best nation at the 2018 European Badminton Championships.
 1521 October 2018 Denmark Open takes place in Odense.

Cycling
 24 February – Christina Siggaard wins Omloop Het Nieuwsblad.
 27 February – 4 March – Denmark wins two silver medals and one bronze medal at the 2018 UCI Track Cycling World Championships
 1 April – Mads Pedersen finishes second in the Tour of Flanders.
 15 April – Michael Valgren wins the Amstel Gold Race.
 4–20 May – 2018 IIHF World Championship will be hosted by Copenhagen and Herning, Denmark.
 22 July – Magnus Cort wins the 15th stage of the Tour de France.
 7 October – Søren Kragh Andersen wins 2018 Paris–Tours.

Golf
 3 June Thorbjørn Olesen wins Italian Open.
 8 September – Denmark wins the Eisenhower Trophy for the first time.
 30 September – Thorbjørn Olesen wins the 2018 Ryder Cup as part of the European team.
 7 October – Lucas Bjerregaard wins Alfred Dunhill Links Championship.

Sailing
 3012 August  The [[ 2018 Sailing World Championships[[ are held in Aarhus.

Swimming
 3-12 August – Denmark wins three silver medals and one bronze medal at the 2018 European Aquatics Championships.

Tennis
 27 January – Caroline Wozniacki wins Australian Open.
 1-7 October – Caroline Wozniacki wins China Open.

Other
 18 April – In basketball, Bakken Bears loses a 2017–18 FIBA Europe Cup semifinal to S.S. Felice Scandone.
 14 July – Helle Frederiksen wins a gold medal in the ITU Long Distance Triathlon World Championships.
 4-11 August – With one gold medal, one silver medal and one bronze medal, Denmark finishes as the fourth best nation at the 2018 World Orienteering Championships.

Deaths
 14 January – Erling Mandelmann, photographer (born 1935)
 21 January – Jens Okking, actor (born (1939)
 2 February – Ole Thestrup, actor (born 1948)
 13 February – Prince Henrik, Prince Consort (born 1934)
 19 February – Nini Theilade, ballet dancer and choreographer (born 1915)
 5 April – Grethe Krogh, organist and professor (born 1928)
 9 May – Per Kirkeby, artist (born 1938)
 25 May – Merete Ries, publisher (born 1938)
 28 May – Jens Christian Skou, biochemist and Nobel laureate (born 1918)
 19 June – Princess Elisabeth of Denmark, member of the extended Danish royal family (born 1935)
 16 August – Benny Andersen, writer and composer (born 1929)
 30 September – Kim Larsen, musician (born 1945)
 14 November – Morten Grunwald, actor (born 1934)
 23 December – Troels Kløvedal, author and sailer (born 1943)

See also
2018 in Danish music

References

 
Years of the 21st century in Denmark
Denmark
Denmark
2010s in Denmark